Gug or GUG may refer to:

 Avianca Guatemala, a defunct Guatemalan airline
 Gay until graduation
 Girls Under Glass, a German musical group
 Guarani language
 Gugulethu, a township in the Western Cape, South Africa
 Madeleine Gug (1913–1971), French film editor
 Valine, encoded by codon GUG
 Gugs, creatures in H. P. Lovecraft's novella The Dream-Quest of Unknown Kadath